The 2010 Cincinnati Masters (also known as the Western & Southern Financial Group Masters and Western & Southern Financial Group Women's Open for sponsorship reasons) was a tennis tournament that were played on outdoor hard courts at the Lindner Family Tennis Center in Mason, Ohio, United States, with the men playing from August 14 through August 22, 2010, and the women from August 7 through August 15, 2010. It was the 109th edition of the Cincinnati Masters (82nd for the women), and was part of the ATP Masters Series of the 2010 ATP World Tour, and of the Premier Series of the 2010 WTA Tour.

ATP entrants

Seeds

 Seedings are based on the rankings of August 9, 2010

Other entrants
The following players received wildcards into the singles main draw
  James Blake
  Mardy Fish
  Robby Ginepri
  Donald Young

The following players received entry from the qualifying draw:
  Benjamin Becker
  Taylor Dent
  Somdev Devvarman
  Alejandro Falla
  Santiago Giraldo
  Denis Istomin
  Florian Mayer

Notable withdrawals
  Juan Martín del Potro (wrist injury)
  Juan Carlos Ferrero (flu)
  Fernando González (calf)
  Albert Montañés
  Jo-Wilfried Tsonga (knee injury)

WTA entrants

Seeds

 Seedings are based on the rankings of August 2, 2010.

Other entrants
The following players received wildcards into the singles main draw
  Jamie Hampton
  Christina McHale
  Coco Vandeweghe

The following players received entry from the qualifying draw:
  Akgul Amanmuradova
  Gréta Arn
  Sorana Cîrstea
  Kimiko Date-Krumm
  Vera Dushevina
  Bojana Jovanovski
  Vania King
  Alla Kudryavtseva
  Nuria Llagostera Vives
  Ayumi Morita
  Monica Niculescu
  Anastasia Rodionova

Notable withdrawals
  Justine Henin (elbow injury)
  Samantha Stosur (shoulder injury)
  Serena Williams (foot surgery)
  Venus Williams (knee injury)
  María José Martínez Sánchez (knee injury)

Finals

Men's singles

 Roger Federer defeated  Mardy Fish 6–7(5–7), 7–6(7–1), 6–4
It was Federer's 2nd title of the year and 63rd of his career. It was his 4th win at the event also winning in 2005, 2007, and 2009. It was his 17th Masters 1000 title.

Women's singles

 Kim Clijsters defeated  Maria Sharapova 2–6, 7–6(7–4), 6–2
It was Clijsters' 3rd title of the year and 38th of her career.

Men's doubles

 Bob Bryan /  Mike Bryan defeated  Mahesh Bhupathi /  Max Mirnyi 6–3, 6–4.

Women's doubles

 Victoria Azarenka /  Maria Kirilenko defeated  Lisa Raymond /  Rennae Stubbs 7–6(7–4), 7–6(10–8)

External links
 
 Association of Tennis Professionals (ATP) tournament profile

 
2010 ATP World Tour
Western and Southern Financial Group Women's Open
2010
2010 in sports in Ohio